Quảng Nam is a province in the Central region of Vietnam. It is bordered by Thừa Thiên–Huế province to the north, the nation of Laos to the west, Kon Tum province to the southwest, Quảng Ngãi province to the southeast, the South China Sea to the east, and the city of Da Nang to the northeast. The province is known for being a tourist destination in the Hội An cultural site, alongside an export and manufacturing hub within central Vietnam.

History
Human habitation in the province has been continuous for 2,200 years, starting with the Sa Huỳnh culture.

Quảng Nam was once the political and near the geographic centre of Champa and the province was gifted in 1307 in exchange for a marriage to a Vietnamese princess. For some time both the most powerful city-state and the busiest Cham port (at Hội An) were located in what is now Quảng Nam. Trade in luxury goods from the Central Highlands was the basis of this wealth and power.
As a result of warfare with Vietnam, the centre of political power of the Cham shifted south to Vijaya.
The trade in luxuries continued for some time under the Nguyễn lords but declined gradually, especially under the Nguyễn dynasty and further in colonial Vietnam, when the economic focus shifted to the agriculture of the large river deltas.

As the site contained several mountain passes, it has historically been a center for conflict between ruling powers and dynastic struggles. The site was the scene of heavy inter-dynastic fighting between the Trịnh–Nguyễn War and the point in which the Nguyen dynasty had escaped following their expulsion from their strongholds in the north. Its primary city of Hội An was destroyed and rebuilt during the Tay Son rebellion.

The province of Quang Nam has historically served as a trade site and was a major port region in Southeast Asia for trading high-grade silk, fabrics, paper, porcelain, areca nuts, pepper, Chinese medicines, elephant tusks, beeswax, mother-of-pearl and lacquer. The Dutch brought Vietnamese slaves they captured from Nguyễn lord territories in Quảng Nam province to their colony in Taiwan.

As a trade hub, Quang Nam would also serve as the site where Western influence would enter into Vietnam. Notably Alexandre de Rhodes who had written the alphabet, and also where a military alliance with France was signed between Nguyen dynasty monarchs fleeing the Tay Son Rebellion. The region would also see the start of French colonization during Cochinchina campaign and the Siege of Tourane.

The province was split into two in 1962, with the southern half known as Quảng Tín province. The province was also the site of heavy fighting during the Vietnam War, until it was captured in the Hue–Da Nang Campaign. The two provinces were merged again after unification in 1976. In 1997 its former capital city of Da Nang was separated into its own administrative entity.

Geography
Quảng Nam comprises flat land along the coast and increasingly high elevations towards the west, with the highest elevations along the border to Laos and Kon Tum province. The highest peak is Ngọc Linh mountain at 2598m. In contrast to the other provinces of the South Central Coast there are no hills or mountains near the coast (with the exception of the Chàm Islands with a peak of 517m).

More than half of Quảng Nam's area is covered by forests, making it one of the most forested provinces in Vietnam. Forests dominate in the west of the province and along the border to Quảng Ngãi province. 111,900ha of land are used for agriculture, mostly in the east of the province.

The Thu Bồn River system covers most of the province (except for the south-east), making it one of the largest river systems in central Vietnam. It led to the rise of an ancient Cham city state that was once Champa's most influential city and also included one of its most important commercial ports at Hội An.

Administrative divisions
Quảng Nam subdivided into 18 district-level sub-divisions:

 15 districts:
 Bắc Trà My
 Duy Xuyên
 Đại Lộc
 Điện Bàn
 Đông Giang
 Hiệp Đức
 Nam Giang
 Nam Trà My
 Núi Thành
 Phú Ninh
 Phước Sơn
 Quế Sơn
 Tây Giang
 Thăng Bình
 Tiên Phước
 Nông Sơn
 1 district-level town:
 Điện Bàn (newly created)
 2 provincial cities:
 Hội An (a UNESCO world heritage site)
 Tam Kỳ (capital)

They are further subdivided into 13 commune-level towns (or townlets), 213 communes, and 18 wards.

Economy
Quảng Nam has two famous traditional products: the world's highest essential oil content Trà My cinnamon (aka Saigon Cinnamon) and Ngọc Linh ginseng. Quảng Nam is famous for its production of Saigon cinnamon.

The economy of Quảng Nam has been growing rapidly in recent years. GDP growth in 2010 was 12.7% and the goal for 2011 is 13.5%. Growth has been between 12 and 15% in the years from 2005 to 2007, mostly driven by a booming industrial sector (growing more than 20% per year) and to a lesser extent the service sector. GDP per capita in 2007 was 8.76 million Vietnamese đồng, 65.2% of the national average.

Quảng Nam's economy has been diversified significantly during the first decade of the 21st century. Agriculture, forestry, and fishery made up 41.5% of the province's GDP in 2000 but only 21.4% in 2010. This is only a relative decline. Growth of the first sector has been positive but overshadowed by industrial and service growth. It was between 2 and 4% between 2000 and 2007 and 4.5% in 2010. The vast majority of the work force is still employed in this sector: 524,700 out of 778,300 as of 2007 (down from 548,700 in 2000). Harvests of rice, which takes up 75% of the agricultural area, has increased from 329,900 tons in 2000 to 395,100 tons in 2007 (1.1% of the national rice output).
The cultivation of industrial crops has experienced a significant transformation. The production of some crops has declined significantly: sugar cane from 170,400t in 2000 to 46,500t in 2007, tobacco from 2200t to 900t, tea from 1935t to 821t, and coconut from 8741t to 3675t, while the output of other crops has been increased: peanuts from 10,700t to 16,900t, rubber from 0t to 186t, pepper from 22t to 205t, and cashew nuts from 362t to 2345t. Given the recent significant expansion of rubber plantations, this crop is likely to grow further. So far, only peanut cultivation is significant in a national context, making up 3.35% of national output, while the other non-cereal crops contribute less than 1%.

Industrial GDP has been the main driving force of Quảng Nam's economy in the first decade of the century. In 2010 it contributed 40.1% to the provincial GDP, up from just 25.3% in 2000 and employed 99,600 workers in 2007, compared to 51,600 in 2000. Industrial GDP has increased 2.48 times between 2000 and 2007 and continues to grow at around 20%.
Chu Lai Economic Zone is located in the south of the province along National Road 1 and is the site of many of the province's factories. A smaller industrial zone is located in Tam Kỳ with factories producing electrical equipment, garments, and processed wood.
Major industrial export products include leather shoes (US$51.26 million in 2007), garments (US$31.33 million), wooden products (US$8.587 million), and paper materials (US$2.136 million). Industrial products more oriented towards the domestic market include fish sauce (3.69 million liters), bricks (253 million pieces), fabric (52.5 million meters), and hand farming tools (2 million pieces).

Quang Nam has the biggest gas warehouse in the central area: Total Gas & Power Co. Ltd's Ky Ha gas warehouse.

Transportation
National Route 1 runs through the east of the province. Both Tam Kỳ and Chu Lai Economic Zone are located along this road, while Hội An is around 10 km east of it. National Road 14 runs from Thừa Thiên–Huế province through the west of Quảng Nam to Đắk Glei District in Kon Tum province in the Central Highlands. It is connected to National Road 1A by 14B in north and 14E in central Quảng Nam and the border to Laos through 14D.
57.7% of the roads in (national, provincial, or district) are paved with asphalt, which is somewhat above the median value of provinces in Vietnam. The value is much higher and significantly better than the median for provincially managed roads: 87.68%. Only 29% of respondents to a survey of businesses in 2009 stated that road quality is good or very good (slightly above the median).

Vietnam's North–South Railway runs through the provinces. Some, but not all, trains stop at Tam Kỳ Railway Station serving the provincial capital Tam Kỳ.

Da Nang International Airport is located in Da Nang just north of Quảng Nam. Another airport, Chu Lai Airport is located in Núi Thành District in the south of the province near Quảng Ngãi province, serving Chu Lai Economic Zone.

Places of interest 
The province has two UNESCO World Heritage Sites: the ancient town of Hội An and the Mỹ Sơn temple complex. It also lies on the World Heritage Road which connects different World Heritage Sites in Central Vietnam.

Another popular tourist site is Cu Lao Cham (Cham Islands).

Cuisine
Cao lầu
Mì Quảng
Tam Kỳ chicken rice
Tam Kỳ Jasmine tea
Banh dap (rice cake)
Banh vac (cake)
Banh it (cake)

References

External links

 
Provinces of Vietnam